This is a summary of 1973 in music in the United Kingdom, including the official charts from that year.

Events
date unknown - The Royal Northern College of Music is established by the merger of the Northern School of Music (established 1920) and the Royal Manchester College of Music (established 1893)
9 January – Mick Jagger's request for a Japanese visa is rejected on account of a 1969 drug conviction, putting an end to The Rolling Stones' plans to perform in Japan during their forthcoming tour.
18 January – The Rolling Stones' benefit concert for Nicaraguan earthquake victims raises over $350,000
14 February – David Bowie collapses from exhaustion after a performance at New York's Madison Square Garden.
1 March - Pink Floyd releases The Dark Side of the Moon, which goes on to become one of the best-selling albums of all time.
8 March – Paul McCartney is fined $240 after pleading guilty to charges of growing marijuana outside his Scottish farm.
14 March - The singers Stephen Stills and Véronique Sanson are married near Guildford, England.
7 April – Cliff Richard takes part in the 18th Eurovision Song Contest. He finishes in 3rd place with the song "Power to All Our Friends".
4 May - 29 July – Led Zeppelin embarks on a tour of the United States, during which they set the record for highest attendance for a concert, 56,800, at the Tampa Stadium in Tampa, Florida.  The record was previously held by The Beatles. Performances for the movie The Song Remains the Same are also filmed.
12 May - David Bowie is the first rock artist to perform at Earls Court Exhibition Centre.
25 May – Mike Oldfield's Tubular Bells becomes the first release on Richard Branson's newly launched Virgin label.
May - Benjamin Britten has surgery to replace a failing heart valve.
4 June - Ronnie Lane plays his last show with Faces at the Edmonton Sundown in London. Lane had informed the band three weeks earlier that he was quitting.
16 June - Benjamin Britten's opera Death in Venice, receives its première at Snape Maltings.
30 June - Ian Gillan quits Deep Purple.
3 July – David Bowie 'retires' his stage persona Ziggy Stardust in front of a shocked audience at the Hammersmith Odeon at the end of his British tour.
4 July – Slade drummer Don Powell is critically injured in a car crash in Wolverhampton; his 20-year-old girlfriend is killed.
13 July - Queen release their debut album.
15 July - Ray Davies of The Kinks makes an emotional outburst during a performance at White City Stadium, announcing he is quitting the group. He later withdraws the statement.
20 August - The London Symphony Orchestra becomes the first British orchestra to take part in the Salzburg Festival.
20 October – Queen Elizabeth II opens Sydney Opera House.
November - Karl Jenkins is among the participants in a live-in-the-studio performance of Mike Oldfield's Tubular Bells for the BBC. 
20 November - The Who open their Quadrophenia US tour with a concert at San Francisco's Cow Palace, but drummer Keith Moon passes out and has to be carried off the stage. Nineteen-year-old fan Scot Halpin is selected from the audience to finish the show; Halpin would later be awarded Rolling Stone magazine's "Pick-Up Player of the Year Award" for his historic performance.
date unknown - The Taverner Consort and Players are founded by Andrew Parrott.

Number Ones

Singles

Albums

Year-end charts
Between 2 January and 6 December 1973.

Best-selling singles

Notes:

Best-selling albums
The list of the top fifty best-selling albums of 1973 were published in Record Mirror at the end of the year, and later reproduced in the first edition of the BPI Year Book in 1976. However, in 2007 the Official Charts Company published album chart histories for each year from 1956 to 1977, researched by historian Sharon Mawer, and included an updated list of the top ten best-selling albums for each year based on the new research. The updated top ten for 1973 is shown in the table below. The most significant changes from the original BMRB chart were that the album previously thought to be the year's best-seller, the soundtrack to the film That'll Be the Day, fell to tenth position, and Don't Shoot Me I'm Only the Piano Player
by Elton John moved up from number four to become the new best-selling album of 1973.

Notes:

Classical music: new works
Malcolm Arnold - Symphony No. 7
Jeffrey Lewis - Aurora
William Mathias - Missa Brevis
Nicholas Maw - Life Studies
Patric Standford - Christus Requiem
Michael Tippett - Piano Sonata No. 3
Grace Williams - Ave Maris Stella

Opera
Benjamin Britten - Death in Venice

Film and Incidental music
John Barry - A Doll's House, starring Claire Bloom, Anthony Hopkins, Ralph Richardson and Denholm Elliott.
Richard Rodney Bennett - Lady Caroline Lamb directed by Robert Bolt, starring Sarah Miles.
Albert Elms - Love Thy Neighbour.
Paul Ferris - The Creeping Flesh directed by Freddie Francis, starring Peter Cushing and Christopher Lee.

Musical theatre
13 May - Cyrano, with book and lyrics by Anthony Burgess and music by Michael J. Lewis, opens at the Palace Theatre, London, starring Christopher Plummer; it runs for 49 performances.

Musical films
Jesus Christ Superstar, a film adaptation of the Andrew Lloyd Webber/Tim Rice rock opera, directed by Norman Jewison

Births
11 January - Tom Gladwin, bassist (Shed Seven)
3 March - Matthew Marsden, actor and singer
13 March - Eloy de Jong, Dutch-born singer (Caught in the Act)
22 March - Beverley Knight, soul singer
14 May 
Sinéad O'Carroll, Irish singer (B*Witched)
Natalie Appleton, Canadian-born singer (All Saints)
21 May - Noel Fielding, comedian and musician
23 May - Nikki Yeoh, jazz pianist
6 July - Paul Banks, guitarist (Shed Seven)
16 July - Schelim Hannan, singer (Worlds Apart)
19 July - Martin Powell, keyboard player and songwriter (Cradle of Filth, My Dying Bride, Cryptal Darkness, and Anathema)
22 July - Daniel Jones, English-Australian guitarist, songwriter, and producer 
23 July - Fran Healy, singer-songwriter (Travis)
6 August - Donna Lewis, singer
10 August - Jon O'Mahony, drummer (Ultra)
21 August - Ally Begg, singer (Bad Boys Inc)
30 August - Leon Caffrey, drummer (Space)
17 September - Amy Black, operatic mezzo-soprano (died 2009)
27 September - Lee Brennan, singer (911)
29 September - Alfie Boe, operatic tenor
9 October - Cal Cooper, singer (Worlds Apart)
10 October - Scott Morriss, bassist (The Bluetones)
10 November – Jacqui Abbott, vocalist (The Beautiful South)
4 December - Naima Belkhiati, singer (Honeyz)

Deaths
3 February - Edward Lockspeiser, musicologist, composer and radio broadcaster, 67
26 March - Noël Coward, composer and dramatist, 73
18 April - Ronald Center, composer, 60
24 May - Sid Phillips, jazz clarinetist, bandleader, and arranger, 65
8 June - Tubby Hayes, jazz musician, 38 (during heart surgery)
9 August – Donald Peers, singer, 66
16 August - Astra Desmond, contralto, 80
6 September - Sir William Henry Harris, composer, 90
22 October - David Franklin, opera singer and broadcaster, 65
27 October - Norman Allin, operatic bass, 88
26 November - John Rostill, bassist and composer, 31 (electrocuted by faulty guitar equipment)
6 December - Frederic Curzon, composer and conductor, 74
17 December - Patrick Hadley, composer, 74
date unknown - Harry Dexter, music critic and composer of light music, 63

See also 
 1973 in British radio
 1973 in British television
 1973 in the United Kingdom
 List of British films of 1973

References 

 
British
British music by year